Kombavilai is a village located in Agasteeswaram Taluk, Kanyakumari District, Tamil Nadu, India.  The village is surrounded by paddy fields, coconut groves, element enriched and beautiful sea shore (Arabian Sea). Further, this village has a pleasant climate throughout the year and benefited by both north east and south west monsoons. The people are living harmoniously with religious diversity of worshiping Hindu Goddess Devi Mutharamman, Esakiamman, Swamy Sriman Ayya Narayanaswamy and Christians as minor population. Nearly two hundred people live here and most of the people are educated; kombavilai has an average literacy rate of 90%, far higher than the national average of 59.5%: male literacy is 91%, and female literacy is 89%. The Holy place of Swamythoppu pathy (Ayyavazhi) is located near Muhilankudierrupu, 7 km away

Geographical location 
Kombavilai is located at 5 km away from Kanyakumari on west coastal road and 16 km from Nagercoil (capital town of Kanyakumari on the road connecting Kanyakumari with Nagercoil and nearest city 80 km from Trivandrum (Kerala). It has an average elevation of 10 metres (10 feet). It lies at the Arabian Sea. It is situated at 8° 4′ 41″ N, 77° 32′ 28″ E.

Institutions
An institution for Varmam kalai, an ancient form of art and medicinal value is started to protect the ancient values

Economic Activity

This village has agriculture as main economy with rice, banana and coconut cultivation. Some people work in rice field, plucking coconut and palm tree products are produced. Some part of population are working in service sector like teaching, Pharmacy, nursing and construction workers.

References 
1.http://varmaniam.com/

Villages in Kanyakumari district